Zachary Charles Bolton (born August 9, 1981) is an American ADR director, line producer and voice actor, known for his work at Funimation. He is often credited as Z. Charles Bolton.

In November 2020, he married voice actor Kara Edwards.

Filmography

Anime series

Film

Video games 
 Borderlands 2 – O'Cantler, Pyrotech, Robb Claymore

Production credits

Voice director

Producer

References

External links 
 
 

1981 births
Living people
American male voice actors
Television producers from Ohio
American voice directors
American audio engineers
Male actors from Cincinnati
University of North Texas alumni
Engineers from Ohio
21st-century American engineers
21st-century American male actors